Brookgreen Gardens is a sculpture garden and wildlife preserve, located just south of Murrells Inlet, in South Carolina. The  property includes several themed gardens featuring American figurative sculptures, the Lowcountry Zoo, and trails through several ecosystems in nature reserves on the property. It was founded by Archer Milton Huntington, stepson of railroad magnate Collis Potter Huntington, and Anna Hyatt Huntington, his wife, to feature sculptures by Anna and her sister Harriet Randolph Hyatt Mayor, along with other American sculptors. Brookgreen Gardens was opened in 1932. It was developed on property of four former rice plantations, taking its name from the former Brookgreen Plantation, which dates to the antebellum period.

Early history 
The property that now comprises Brookgreen Gardens was four rice plantations. The plantations from south to north were The Oaks, Brookgreen, Springfield, and Laurel Hill. The current gardens and surrounding facilities are located completely within the former Brookgreen Plantation, which was owned by Joshua John Ward. Before his death in 1853, he held more than 1,000 enslaved African Americans and in 1860 his estate (in his name) was the largest slaveholder in the United States.

Only a handful of relics survive on the former plantations. The Alston (or Allston) cemetery survives on the grounds of The Oaks plantation. Gov. Joseph Alston and his child are buried in the cemetery. The same grave is a memorial to the governor's wife Theodosia Burr Alston, daughter of Vice President of the United States Aaron Burr, who was lost at sea. Her ghost is said to haunt the Grand Strand, looking for her father. The rice mill at Laurel Hill is all that stands of that plantation today. During the American Civil War, Confederates built an earthen structure on the grounds to block Union Navy ships from coming into the tidal rivers.

The Huntingtons
Archer and Anna Hyatt Huntington of Redding, Connecticut purchased the four plantations in order to develop gardens to showcase her sculptures. Situated on Waccamaw Neck in Georgetown County, South Carolina, between the Waccamaw River and the Atlantic Ocean, Brookgreen Gardens is the country's first public sculpture garden. It has the largest collection in the world of figurative sculpture by American artists in an outdoor setting. It is also a nature and historical preserve with a small zoo and a nature exhibition center.

Archer and Anna Hyatt Huntington first visited the area in 1929. They intended to establish a winter home on the coast, but Anna saw the potential of the property. They began to develop her vision of making it a showcase for her sculptures. Archer, son of philanthropists Arabella Worsham Huntington and stepson of Collis Huntington, and Anna have donated property and contributed to U.S. arts and culture in a number of states. Her sculpture of Joan of Arc is a feature of New York City's Riverside Park.

Public landmark

Sculpture gardens

About 1,445 works of American figurative sculpture are displayed at the Archer and Anna Hyatt Huntington Sculpture Garden. Many of the works are by Hyatt Huntington, but other artists are also featured. Walkways and garden paths link the sculptures in their distinctive garden, fountain, or landscape settings, with vistas of the scenery surrounding them.
A  area of Brookgreen Gardens was listed on the National Register of Historic Places in 1978. The sculpture garden portion, of Brookgreen Gardens was included in the designation of Atalaya and Brookgreen Gardens as a National Historic Landmark in 1984. Atalaya Castle is just across U.S. 17, which cuts through the former combined Huntington property.

The sculpture gardens includes works by:

 Robert Alexander Baillie
 Gutzon Borglum
 Joseph Lorkowski Boulton
 Clio Hinton Bracken
 Cornelia Van Auken Chapin
 Henry Clews
 Joseph Bailey Ellis
 Sally James Farnham
 Joseph Charles Fleri
 Vincent Glinsky
 Karl Gruppe
 Ethel Painter Hood
 Edith Howland
 Cecil de Blaquiere Howard
 Anna Hyatt Huntington
 Leo Lentelli
 Donald De Lue
 Albino Manca
 Edward Francis McCartan
 Eleanor Mary Mellon
 Roland Hinton Perry
 Attilio Piccirilli
 Furio Piccirilli
 Horatio Piccirilli
 Augustus Saint-Gaudens
 Louis St. Gaudens
 Marion Sanford
 Janet Scudder
 Amory Coffin Simons
 Erwin Springweiler
 Charles Eugene Tefft

Lowcountry Trail
Winner of the South Carolina Heritage Tourism Award, the Lowcountry Trail is a boardwalk that crosses the hillside overlooking Mainfield, a restored rice field of the former Brookgreen Plantation. For enslaved African Americans on Brookgreen Plantation, this hill was a bridge between the world of daily work and life in the slave village beyond the crest of the hill. The rhythms of life – planting, growing, harvesting, threshing – changed seasonally for everyone on the rice plantation.

Archaeological survey and excavation projects have revealed the remains of four structures on the hillside: the site of the overseer's residence at the apex of the hill, and its kitchen, smokehouse and dependency closer to the edge of the rice field. Along the trail, interpretive panels that describe life on a rice plantation and four stainless steel figures have been placed to represent the Plantation Owner, the Overseer, and an Enslaved African Male and an Enslaved African Female. These figures were created in stainless steel by Babette Bloch.

Lowcountry Trail Audio Tour
The Lowcountry Trail Audio Tour is a public education program that emphasizes historic preservation. The tour winds along the Ricefield Overlook and adjacent rice field and is free with garden admission.

Zoo and plantation sites
The Lowcountry Zoo and the Lowcountry Center are also on the property. 'Trekker tours' are conducted on the backroads of the former plantations. Recent archeological work has uncovered the foundations of several buildings at The Oaks plantation. Ponds have been created from the former 'Brookgreen' plantation house sites.

Natural areas
The Atlantic Coast side of the property was later leased to the state of South Carolina to form Huntington Beach State Park. Boat tours are available from here with views of Sandy Island. A self-guided tour of the nature trail shows off the 2000 identified species of life, including longleaf pines, Spanish moss draped live oaks, and vistas of the river, and nearby marshland. The gardens make every effort to preserve the natural environment.

Nights of a Thousand Candles
Every year, the Brookgreen gardens are lit with more than 2,700 candles and countless lights set among the plants, trees and sculptures of the garden. Tickets for the same are available every year for visitors.

Awards and recognition 
 Top 10 Public Gardens in the U.S. by Coastal Living Magazine
 American Public Gardens Association Award for Garden Excellence, 2019
 Gari Melchers Memorial Medal from the Artists’ Fellowship, 2018
 USAToday 10Best - #9 in Best Botanical Garden category, 2018
 USAToday 10Best - Nights of a Thousand Candles Top 10 in Best Botanical Garden Holiday Lights category, 2018

See also 

List of botanical gardens and arboretums in the United States
List of sculpture parks

Photo gallery

References

External links 

 Brookgreen In Infrared
 Beautiful Photos of Brookgreen Gardens

 Brookgreen Gardens - Murrell's Inlet, SC

Art museums and galleries in South Carolina
Sculpture gardens, trails and parks in the United States
Museums in Georgetown County, South Carolina
Outdoor sculptures in South Carolina
Gardens in South Carolina
Zoos in South Carolina
National Historic Landmarks in South Carolina
Institutions accredited by the American Alliance of Museums
National Register of Historic Places in Georgetown County, South Carolina
Protected areas of Georgetown County, South Carolina
Historic district contributing properties in South Carolina
Protected areas established in 1932
Art museums established in 1932
1932 establishments in South Carolina
Huntington family